Dataparallel-C: C with parallel extensions by Hatcher and Quinn of the University of New Hampshire. Dataparallel-C was based on an early version of C* and runs on the Intel iPSC/2 and nCUBE. 

C programming language family